Elena Bogdan and Noppawan Lertcheewakarn were the defending champions, but they did not compete in the juniors this year.

Tímea Babos and Sloane Stephens won the tournament, defeating Lara Arruabarrena Vecino and María Teresa Torró Flor in the final, 6–2, 6–3.

Seeds

Draw

Finals

Top half

Bottom half

References 
 Main draw

Girls Doubles
French Open, 2010 Girls' Doubles